Stories from the Heart is a Philippine television drama romance anthology broadcast by GMA Network. It premiered on September 13, 2021 on the network's Afternoon Prime line up replacing Ang Dalawang Ikaw. The series concluded on January 7, 2022 with a total of 85 episodes. It was replaced by Little Princess in its timeslot.

Cast and characters

Loving Miss Bridgette
 Beauty Gonzalez as Bridgette "Bridge" de Leon
 Kelvin Miranda as Marcus M. Villareal
 Bing Loyzaga as Stella Morales-Villareal
 Lloyd Samartino as Manolo Villareal
 Adrian Alandy as Luther Tamayo
 Polo Ravales as Tristan Enriquez
 Tart Carlos as Elsa Manalo
 Pamela Prinster as Abegail "Abby" Mendoza
 Nikki Co as Waxee Galang
 Shanicka Arganda as Nina Torrente
 Julie Lee as Miriam Solano
 Noel Colet as Samuel Solano

Never Say Goodbye
 Klea Pineda as Joyce Kintanar
 Jak Roberto as Bruce Pelaez
 Lauren Young as Victoria Flores-Pelaez
 Snooky Serna as Susan Kintanar
 Max Eigenmann as Jackilyn "Jack" Kintanar
 Kim Rodriguez as Lily Pelaez
 Shermaine Santiago as Darla Delos Reyes
 Mosang as Corazon "Nay Cora" Santos
 Herlene Budol as Alana Santos
 Luke Conde as Edwin Cabrera
 Phytos Ramirez as Joshua Quinto
 Art Acuna as Bernard Flores

Love on Air
 Khalil Ramos as Joseph Garcia / DJ Jojo
 Gabbi Garcia as Wanda Dimaano / Miss Wonderful
 Kate Valdez as Joana "Joan" Sevilla
 Yasser Marta as Ignacio Boy Logronio / Nacho Bautista / Iggy Boy
 Kiray Celis as Meanne Rivera
 Jason Francisco as Rommel Montella
 Anjo Damiles as Vincent Rivera
Psalms David as Zimba Dimaano
 Sunshine Cruz as Deborah Gutierrez

The End of Us
 Carmina Villarroel as Maggie Corpuz
 Zoren Legaspi as Jeffrey Guevara
 Ariella Arida as Eunice Uytengco
 Johnny Revilla as Hermes Concepcion
 Karel Marquez as Wendy Corpuz
 Andrew Gan as Javier Uytengco

Episodes

Production
Principal photography for Never Say Goodbye commenced in June 2021. While filming for Loving Miss Bridgette began on July 21, 2021 on Tanay, Rizal.

Ratings
According to AGB Nielsen Philippines' Nationwide Urban Television Audience Measurement People in television homes, the pilot episode of Stories from the Heart earned a 6.1% rating.

References

External links
 
 

2021 Philippine television series debuts
2022 Philippine television series endings
Filipino-language television shows
GMA Network original programming
Philippine anthology television series
Television shows set in the Philippines